The Rikoti Pass (el. ) is a mountain pass in the southern portion of the Likhi Range, a spur of the Greater Caucasus which divides Georgia into its western and eastern parts.

References 
 

Mountain passes of Georgia (country)